Intentionalism may refer to:
 Intentionalism, focus on original intent in constitutional and statutory interpretation
 Authorial intentionalism, focus on authorial intent in aesthetic interpretation
 Intentionalism (philosophy of mind)
 Functionalism versus intentionalism, a historiographical debate